Anti-Corruption is a 1975 film written and directed by Ng See Yuen. It was the first film produced by Ng's company Seasonal Film Corporation. Anti-Corruption was co-produced by Eternal Film.

The film shows the incidents that precipitated the creation of the Independent Commission Against Corruption in 1974. Anti-Corruption is a crime thriller that depicts police corruption and was based on an inquiry into the activities of the drug lord Wu Xihao between 1973 and 1974. It was a low-budget film that did well at the box office. On 12 October 1979, the scholar Bo Yang penned a 4,000-word essay about the film in the China Times. Anti-Corruptions success led to many more Hong Kong films about police and criminals to be made.

Cast
Bill Lake
Ling Hon
Sonu kumar

See also
 1975 in film
 List of Hong Kong films of 1975
 Cinema of Hong Kong

References
Footnotes

Bibliography

External links
 
 廉政风暴 at Douban

Hong Kong crime drama films
1975 films
1970s Mandarin-language films
1970s Hong Kong films